Thomas A. Dowd is a game designer who has worked primarily on role-playing games.

Career
Thomas Dowd was one of the writers who supported Fantasy Games Unlimited's role-playing game, Villains and Vigilantes. The Shadowrun 2nd Edition rules from FASA, by Dowd with Paul Hume and Bob Charrette, won the Origins Award for Best Roleplaying Rules of 1992. In 1990, Dowd met Peter Adkison, who was trying to figure out how the gaming industry worked, and Dowd told Adkison to go to the Gama Trade Show. After Jonathan Tweet left White Wolf Publishing for Lion Rampant, Mark Rein-Hagen turned to Dowd for his new game about vampires. Dowd refined the dice pool system from Shadowrun for White Wolf's Vampire: The Masquerade (1991).  Dowd worked with Rein-Hagen to adapt the core mechanics from his previous game success to use d10 instead of d6 for calculating probability.

References

External links
 

Living people
Role-playing game designers
Year of birth missing (living people)
White Wolf game designers